M1906 may refer to:

 .30-06 Springfield ammunition, or "M1906"
 4.7-inch gun M1906
 M1906 Guttekarabin variant of the Krag–Jørgensen
 FN Baby Browning, or "M1906"
 M1906 pistol by Webley & Scott